Jul most commonly refers to:
 July, as an abbreviation for the seventh month of the year in the Gregorian calendar

Jul or JUL  may also refer to:

Celebrations
 Jul, Scandinavian and Germanic word for Yule
 Jul (Denmark), the Danish Yule or Christmas celebration
 Jul (Norway), the Norwegian Yule or Christmas celebration
 Jul (Sweden), the Swedish Yule or Christmas celebration

Music
 Jul (rapper), French hip hop artist, singer, rapper. Name stylized as JUL
 "Jul" (song), 1983 Christmas single by Ralf Peeker
 Jul (Carola Søgaard album), 1991 Christmas album by Loa Falkman
 Jul (Loa Falkman album), 2013 Christmas album by Loa Falkman

Other uses
 Inca Manco Capac International Airport (IATA code)
 jul, ISO 639-3 of the Jirel language
 Yugoslav Left, a former political party of Serbia
 Jul (writer)

See also
 Yule (disambiguation)
 Juul (disambiguation)
 Joule, a unit of energy
 "Jul, jul, strålande jul", Christmas song 
 Jul, jul, strålande jul (disambiguation)
 Jull